Shinasha may refer to:
Shinasha people of Ethiopia
Shinasha language